Hoàng Thị Loan (born 6 February 1995) is a Vietnamese footballer who plays as a defender for Women's Championship club Hà Nội I and the Vietnam women's national team.

International goals
.''Scores and results are list Vietnam's goal tally first.

References

1995 births
Living people
Women's association football midfielders
Vietnamese women's footballers
Vietnam women's international footballers
21st-century Vietnamese women